In cryptography, MMB (Modular Multiplication-based Block cipher) is a block cipher designed by Joan Daemen as an improved replacement for the IDEA cipher. Modular multiplication is the central element in the design. Weaknesses in the key schedule were identified by Eli Biham, and this, together with the cipher's not having been designed to resist linear cryptanalysis, meant that other designs were pursued instead, such as 3-Way.

MMB has a key size and block size of 128 bits.

References

External links
 Paulo Barreto's comments on MMB
 Daemen's PhD thesis (The specification of MMB appears in section 11.5)

Broken block ciphers